Pseudorthygia is a genus of flea beetles in the family Chrysomelidae. There are 2 described species found in Mexico.

Species
 Pseudorthygia nigritarsis (Jacoby, 1891)
 Pseudorthygia unifasciata (Jacoby, 1891)

References

Alticini
Chrysomelidae genera
Articles created by Qbugbot
Taxa named by Ernő Csíki